Benjamin Hugh Lewers (25 March 193225 March 2015) was an Anglican priest in the second half of the 20th century.

Lewers was born on 25 March 1932, educated at  Sherborne School and  Selwyn College, Cambridge, and ordained in 1962. After a curacy at St Mary, Northampton he was  Priest in charge of the Church of the Good Shepherd, Hounslow. From 1968 to 1975 he was an industrial chaplain at Heathrow Airport. After a further incumbency at Newark he was appointed the fifth Provost of Derby Cathedral in 1981. He resigned in 1997 and lived in Marshwood, Dorset, where for many years he assisted at the local church, St Mary the Virgin.

Lewers died on 25 March 2015.

References

1932 births
People educated at Sherborne School
Alumni of Selwyn College, Cambridge
Provosts and Deans of Derby
2015 deaths